The 2014 Dahsyatnya Awards was an awards show for Indonesian musicians. It was the sixth annual show. The show was held on January 21, 2014, at the Jakarta International Expo in Kemayoran, Central Jakarta. The awards show was hosted by Raffi Ahmad, Luna Maya, Olga Syahputra, Ayu Dewi, and Denny Cagur. The awards ceremonies will held theme for "Dahsyatnya Cinta Indonesia".

In 2015, This awards show won the Favorite Special Events award at the Panasonic Gobel Awards.

Raffi Ahmad led the nominations with four categories, followed by JKT48 and Syahrini with three nominations. JKT48 was the biggest winner of the night, taking home three awards for Outstanding Stage Act, Outstanding Collaboration Duo/Group, and Outstanding Song for "River".

Winners and nominees
Winners are listed first and highlighted in boldface.

SMS and social media

Jury

Awards

References

2014 music awards
Dahsyatnya Awards
Indonesian music awards